Beaver was launched in 1796 at Liverpool. She made seven complete voyages as a slave ship in the triangular trade in enslaved persons. She was captured and retaken once, in 1804, and captured a second time in 1807, during her eighth voyage.

Career
Beaver first appeared in Lloyd's Register (LR) in the volume for 1796.

1st slave voyage (1796–1797): Captain Alexander Grierson sailed from Liverpool on 3 March 1796. Beaver arrived at Barbados on 22 November with 390 slaves. She sailed from Barbados on 11 December and arrived back at Liverpool on 22 January 1797. She had left Liverpool with 29 crew members and she had suffered seven crew deaths on her voyage. 

At Barbados she had been sold. From Barbados she had sailed to Demerara before returning to Liverpool. 

2nd slave voyage (1797–1798): Captain Alexander Grierson acquired a letter of marque on 16 March 1797. He sailed from  Liverpool on 29 March and arrived on the Windward Coast. She was net reported to have been at Angola. Beaver stopped at Barbados and arrived at Demerara from Ambona on 22 November with 350 slaves. She left Demerara on 1 February 1798 and arrived back at Liverpool on 2 April. She arrived with William Neale, master, apparently having changed masters in Demerara. She had left Liverpool with 35 crew members and she had suffered five crew deaths on her voyage. 

3rd slave voyage (1798–1800): Captain William Murray sailed from Liverpool on 29 October 1798. Beaver was reported at Angola. She was at Demerara and arrived at Kingston, Jamaica on 13 October 1799 with 380 slaves. She sailed from Kingston on 15 November and arrived back at Liverpool on 17 January 1800. She had left Liverpool with 38 crew members and she had suffered eight crew deaths on her voyage.

4th slave voyage (1800–1802): Captain Christopher Brew acquired a letter of marque on 6 May 1800. He sailed from Liverpool on 26 June, stopping at Lisbon on the way. Beaver arrived at Suriname on 18 September 1801, having stopped at Prince's Island on her way from Africa. She arrived back at Liverpool on 18 January 1802. She had left Liverpool with 39 crew members and had suffered 13 crew deaths on her voyage.

Lloyd's List reported on 17 November 1801 that the ship  had been captured while sailing from Newfoundland to the West Indies, but that the letter of marques Beaver and  had recaptured her and sent her into Suriname.

5th slave voyage (1802–1803): Captain Robert Taylor arrived at Gravesend from Limerick on 25 March 1802. She sailed from Liverpool on 15 May 1802. Beaver acquired her slaves at New Calabar and arrived at Suriname on 24 November with 250 slaves. She arrived back at Liverpool on 20 April 1803.

6th slave voyage (1803–1803): Captain David Christie acquired a letter of marque on 2 December 1803. He sailed from Liverpool on 20 December 1803. 

In September 1804, Lloyd's List reported that Beaver had been taken in the West Indies while sailing to Barbados from Africa, but had been retaken and sent into Antigua. Beaver was carrying slaves and ivory. Newspaper accounts put the number of slaves at 250.

7th slave voyage (1805–1806): Captain Robert White acquired a letter of marque on 1 October 1805. He sailed from Liverpool on 27 October 1805. Beaver acquired her slaves at Bonny and arrived at St Lucia on 18 April 1806. She sailed for Liverpool on 21 May and arrived there on 6 July. She had left Liverpool with 40 crew members and had suffered 10 crew deaths on her voyage.

She brought with her two casks of Guinea pepper, 138 hogsheads and eight barrels of sugar, 73 bales of cotton, 164 bags of cocoa, and 46 casks and two barrels of coffee, all for the account of her owners, Begg & Co. Captain White brought back one hogshead of Madeira wine for his own account.

8th slave voyage (1807–Loss): Captain John Bradley acquired a letter of marque on 14 January 1807. He sailed from Liverpool on 14 February 1807. Beaver arrived at Barbados from Africa on 21 August.

Fate
Lloyd's List reported in December 1807 that the French privateer General Ferrand had captured a copper-bottomed Guineaman from Liverpool, of 18 guns, and carrying 250 slaves. She had been sailing from Barbados when captured. Lloyd's List reported that the Guineaman was believed to have been Beaver, and that she had been taken into Cuba.

Notes

Citations

1796 ships
Liverpool slave ships
Captured ships